Alphonse John Smith, (November 14, 1883 – December 16, 1935) was an American prelate of the Catholic Church. He served as bishop of the Diocese of Nashville in Tennessee from 1923 to 1935.

Biography
Alphonse Smith was born on November 14, 1883 in Madison, Indiana  He was ordained a priest in Rome by Cardinal Pietro Respighi on April 18, 1908, for the Diocese of Indianapolis.

Bishop of Nashville 
On December 23, 1923, Pope Pius XI named Smith as the sixth bishop of the Diocese of Nashville. He was consecrated on March 25, 1924, in the Cathedral of Saints Peter and Paul in Indianapolis by Bishop Joseph Chartrand. The co-consecrators were Bishops Emmanuel Ledvina  and Samuel Stritch.

When Smith came to the diocese he found there were only a few native priests from the diocese itself and ten seminarians. He worked to change the situation and within two years the number of seminarians from Tennessee had grown to 60, and 26 priests were ordained for the diocese during his episcopate. The monastery of the Poor Clares was established in Memphis, Tennessee. Several new parishes and schools were also established.  In 1925, he founded Father Ryan High School.

Alphonse Smith died in Nashville on December 16, 1935. He is buried in Calvary Cemetery in Nashville.

References

Episcopal succession

1883 births
1935 deaths
20th-century Roman Catholic bishops in the United States
Roman Catholic bishops of Nashville
People from Madison, Indiana
Roman Catholic Archdiocese of Indianapolis
Religious leaders from Indiana
Catholics from Indiana